Greece participated in the Eurovision Song Contest 2015 with the song "One Last Breath" written by Efthivoulos Theoxarous, Maria Elena Kyriakou, Vaggelis Konstantinidis and Evelina Tziora and performed by Kyriakou. The song was selected through the five-participant national final Eurosong 2015 – NERIT & MAD show, developed by NERIT and organised and produced by the private music channel MAD TV.

Greece was drawn to compete in the first semi-final of the Eurovision Song Contest, which took place on 19 May 2015. Performing during the show in position 6, "One Last Breath" was announced among the top 10 entries of the first semi-final and therefore qualified to compete in the final. It was later revealed that Greece placed 6th out of the 18 participating countries in the semi-final with 81 points. At the  final, held four days later, Greece performed 15th out of the 27 finalists and finished in 19th place with 23 points.

Background

Prior to the 2015 contest, Greece had participated in the Eurovision Song Contest thirty-six times since its first entry in 1974, winning it in 2005 with the song "My Number One" performed by Helena Paparizou, and having placed third three times: in 2001 with the song "Die for You" performed by the duo Antique; in 2004 with "Shake It" performed by Sakis Rouvas; and in 2008 with "Secret Combination" performed by Kalomira. Following the introduction of semi-finals for the 2004 contest, Greece has had a top ten placing every year except 2012 and 2014. Its least successful result was in 1998 when it placed twentieth with the song "Mia krifi evaisthisia" by Thalassa, receiving only twelve points in total, all from Cyprus and in 2014 with the song "Rise Up" by Freaky Fortune feat. RiskyKidd, with 35 points, but this time Cyprus was out of the contest.

The Greek national broadcaster, Hellenic Broadcasting Corporation (ERT), was in charge of Greece's participation each year, including the selection process for its entry. Although its selection techniques have varied over the decades, the most common has been a national final in which various acts compete against each other with pre-selected songs, voted on by a jury, televoters, or both. In most cases, internal selections have been reserved for high-profile acts, with the song either being selected internally or with multiple songs—by one or multiple composers—performed by the artist during a televised final. One of the more unusual methods was a reality television talent competition format inspired by the Idol series that ran for many months in 2004, ultimately being scrapped. The notability of the participants has also varied, from previously unsigned acts to established music superstars. Since the 2010s, ERT has used national finals with generally less-established acts.

In August 2013, the Greek government shut down the radio and TV services of the state broadcaster ERT, leaving Greece's future contest participation in question. 
Greece was allowed to participate in 2014 contest, with the interim channel DT organising the national final. On 4 May 2014 the new Greek broadcaster, NERIT, was launched, just 2 days before the first semi final.

On 24 July 2014 Greece confirmed their participation in the 2015 contest. In September there were rumours that Greece could not participate in the contest because NERIT wasn't yet a member of the EBU. Those rumours were later confirmed by EBU. NERIT had submitted an application for Active EBU Membership, which is a requirement in order to participate in the Eurovision Song Contest. The application was reviewed at the EBU General Assembly in December 2014. On 5 December 2014 it was confirmed that NERIT was a member of the EBU.

Before Eurovision

Eurosong 2015 – NERIT & MAD show (60 years of music) 
Eurosong 2015 – NERIT & MAD show (60 years of music) was the Greek national final developed by NERIT to select the Greek entry for the Eurovision Song Contest 2015. Organized and produced by private music channel MAD TV, the competition took place on 4 March 2015 at the Enastron Music Hall in Tavros, Athens, hosted by Mary Sinatsaki and Ntoretta Papadimitriou. The show was televised on NERIT, in Cyprus via the channels RIK 2 and RIK Sat as well as online via the NERIT website and the official Eurovision Song Contest website eurovision.tv.

Competing entries 
Five artists, all signed to record labels, were invited by NERIT to participate in the national final. The five acts: Barrice, C:Real, Maria Elena Kyriakou, Shaya Hansen and Thomai Apergi & Legend were announced on 17 February 2015. Preview videos of the competing songs were presented on 26 February 2015 during a press conference.

Final 
The final took place on 4 March 2015. Five songs competed and the winner, "One Last Breath" performed by Maria Elena Kyriakou, was selected by a 50/50 combination of public voting and jury voting. Public voting was conducted through telephone or SMS, with 33,672 votes being cast during the show.

In addition to the performances of the competing entries, the interval acts featured guest performances by Eurovision Song Contest 2005 winner Helena Paparizou with HouseTwins, 2002 Cypriot Eurovision entrants One, 2011 Greek Eurovision entrant Loukas Giorkas, 2014 Greek Eurovision entrants Freaky Fortune and Riskykidd with the hosts Mary Sinatsaki and Ntoretta Papadimitriou, 1987 Greek Eurovision entrant Thanos Kalliris with the group Kings, Boys and Noise and 2015 Cypriot Eurovision entrant Giannis Karagiannis.

At Eurovision 

The Eurovision Song Contest 2015 took place at Wiener Stadthalle in Vienna, Austria. It consisted of two semi-finals held on 19 and 21 May, respectively, and the final on 23 May 2015. In the 2015 contest, Australia also competed directly in the final as an invited guest nation. The European Broadcasting Union (EBU) split up the competing countries into five different pots based on voting patterns from previous 10 years. On 26 January 2015, an allocation draw was held which placed each country into one of the two semi-finals, as well as which half of the show they would perform in. Greece was placed into the first semi-final, to be held on 19 May 2015, and was scheduled to perform in the first half of the show.

Once all the competing songs for the 2015 contest had been released, the running order for the semi-finals was decided by the shows' producers rather than through another draw, so that similar songs were not placed next to each other.

Voting
Voting during the three shows consisted of 50 percent public televoting and 50 percent from a jury deliberation. The jury consisted of five music industry professionals who were citizens of the country they represent, with their names published before the contest. This jury were asked to judge each contestant based on: vocal capacity; the stage performance; the song's composition and originality; and the overall impression by the act. In addition, no member of a national jury could be related in any way to any of the competing acts in such a way that they cannot vote impartially and independently. The individual rankings of each jury member were released shortly after the final. Below is a breakdown of points awarded to Greece and awarded by Greece in the contest's first semi-final and final, respectively, and the breakdown of the jury voting conducted during the two shows:

Points awarded to Greece

Points awarded by Greece

Detailed voting results
The following members comprised the Greek jury:
 Jick Nakassian (jury chairperson)composer, conductor for Greece in the 1980 contest
 Antonios KaratzikosDJ
 Helen Giannatsoulialyricist
 Ioannis Koutsaftakisartists management, A&R
 Marianna Efstratiousinger, songwriter, represented Greece in the 1989 and 1996 contests

References 

2015
Countries in the Eurovision Song Contest 2015
Eurovision